Chalakrud (also Romanized as Chālakrūd and Chālkorūd; also known as Chalak Roor) is a village in Chehel Shahid Rural District, in the Central District of Ramsar County, Mazandaran Province, Iran.

It is located on the Caspian Sea.

At the 2006 census, its population was 516, in 154 families.

References 

Populated places in Ramsar County
Populated coastal places in Iran
Populated places on the Caspian Sea